Kothangudi may refer to:

Kothangudi, Kumbakonam taluk, a village in the Kumbakonam taluk of Thanjavur district, Tamil Nadu, India
Kothangudi, Papanasam taluk, a village in the Papanasam taluk of Thanjavur district, Tamil Nadu, India